Khon is a dance drama genre from Thailand. Khon has been performed since the Ayutthaya Kingdom.

It is traditionally performed solely in the royal court by men in masks accompanied by narrators and a traditional piphat ensemble. A variation of this genre with female performers is called khon phu ying.

History

Khon is a Thai traditional dance which combines many arts like dance and drama. There was no exact evidence that dates its provenance, but it is mentioned in Thai literature's Lilit Phra Lo (c. 1529) which was written before the era of King Narai Maharaj.

Historical evidence shows that the Thai art of stage plays must have already been highly evolved by the 17th century. In 1687, Louis XIV of France sent a diplomat Simon de la Loubère to record all that he saw in the Siamese Kingdom. In his famous account Du Royaume de Siam, La Loubère carefully observed the classic 17th century theatre of Siam, including an epic battle scene from a Khon performance, and recorded what he saw in great detail:

Of the attire of Siamese Khôn dancers, La Loubère recorded that, "[T]hose that dance in Rabam, and Cone, have gilded paper-bonnets, high and pointed, like the Mandarins caps of ceremony, but which hang down at the sides below their ears, which are adorned with counterfeit stones, and with two pendants of gilded wood."

The origin of Khon is hinted at by the origin of the word "Khon". Its origin is not precisely known, but there are four possibilities. First, "Khon" in Benguela Kalinin appears in the words "kora" or "Khon" which is the name of a musical instrument made of Hindi leather. Its appearance and shape are similar to the drum. It was popular and used for local traditional performances. It was assumed that kora was one of the instruments used in Khon performances. In the Tamil language "Khon" derives from the word "koll" which is close to "goll" or "golumn" in Tamil. These Tamil words relate to dressing or decorating the body from head to toe as in the use of Khon costumes. "Khon" in Iran was derived from the words "zurat khan" which means 'handed-doll' or 'puppet', used in local performances. Its songs were similar to current Khon.

Characters
Khon roles are dictated by long-standing tradition. The principal characters are the heroes, the heroines, the ogres, and the monkeys. The monkeys are some of the most important roles in Khon. The best-known monkey characters in the story is the monkey warrior Hanuman.

Modern Khon contains many elements from the lakhon nai and today, includes female performers playing female characters, formerly performed by men. While the ogre and monkey characters wear masks, most of the human characters do not.

Performances
Khon is based on the tales of the epic Ramakien (Thai adaptation of Indian Hindu epic Ramayana), as Thai literature and drama draws great inspiration from Indian arts and legend. Khon Ramakien originally could be performed by men only. Women performed only as angels and goddesses. Today women perform as monkeys and demons. In the past, Khon was performed only by the royal family, with the sons of the king performing as monkeys and demons. Thai Khon stresses realistic dance moves, especially the monkey, which focuses on beauty and fine monkey-like dancing postures. Khon training is begun at a very young age, so that the performer can become flexible enough to do back flips, especially by the Vanara (forest dwellers or monkey) character.

Gallery

See also

Dance in Thailand
Lakhon Khol, Cambodian equivalent

References

Thai dance
Masked dances
Thai culture
Cultural history of Thailand
Masterpieces of the Oral and Intangible Heritage of Humanity